Xenomystax austrinus is an eel in the family Congridae (conger/garden eels). It was described by David G. Smith and Robert H. Kanazawa in 1989. It is a marine, deep water-dwelling eel which is known from the western central Atlantic Ocean.

References

Congridae
Taxa named by David G. Smith
Taxa named by Robert H. Kanazawa
Fish described in 1989